The Great Day on the Beach is a 1991 Danish drama film directed by Stellan Olsson. The film was selected as the Danish entry for the Best Foreign Language Film at the 64th Academy Awards, but was not accepted as a nominee.

Cast
 Erik Clausen as Axel
 Nina Gunke as Svea
 Benjamin Rothenborg Vibe as Gustav Adolf
 Jesper Klein as Fortælleren
 Hans Alfredson as Morfar (as Hasse Alfredsson)
 Liselotte Lohmann as Emilie
 Bjarne Liller as Skyggen

See also
 List of submissions to the 64th Academy Awards for Best Foreign Language Film
 List of Danish submissions for the Academy Award for Best Foreign Language Film

References

External links
 

1991 films
1991 drama films
Danish drama films
1990s Danish-language films